Pariáns were districts of cities in the Philippines during the country's Spanish colonial era where Chinese (Sangley) were required to live by Spanish colonial authorities. In Luzon there are several towns and cities with districts for chinese settlers, the most famous being the Parian of Manila which moved locations within the city from time to time, before finally settling on Binondo Chinatown, another is in the neighborhood of El Pariancillo in Vigan and Pariancillo in Malolos which was established in 1755 as a Chinese enclave of Malolos that were from migrants from Manila. There are also many other Pariáns throughout Luzon, such as Parian, Mexico, Pampanga (which became the municipality's poblacion), Parian in Calamba, Laguna, etc. In the Visayas, Cebu City had a Parián, which is now a modern-day barangay in the city named Pari-an, and Iloilo City also had a Parián, which was located in the modern-day city district of Molo. Cebu's Parián was founded in 1590 after the arrival of Chinese traders and was supervised by the Jesuits. There were many other Pariáns throughout the Philippines during the Spanish colonial era.

References

Former subdivisions of the Philippines
History of the Philippines (1565–1898)